"Swoon" is a song by The Chemical Brothers, released as the first official single from their 2010 album Further. The song was played on a few occasions by The Chemical Brothers prior to its release in their DJ sets. On 6 May 2010, an official video of the radio edit was uploaded on Parlophone's official YouTube page for the single. The radio edit of Swoon was released as a digital download on iTunes on 9 May 2010. The song entered at number 100 in the UK Singles Chart, the lowest chart position the band has had to date, until it re-entered the charts shortly after at number 88 and again at number 85. Before the song appeared on Further, it appeared on a free CD which came in The Times newspaper; on 16 May 2010. The untitled CD is often called simply The Chemical Brothers – however, only the radio edit was featured.

The Boys Noize remix of "Swoon" featured on the soundtrack of Pro Evolution Soccer 2012.

Track listing
"Swoon (radio edit)" – 3:06

Music video
The music video for the "Swoon" was directed by the duo's long time collaborator Adam Smith and Marcus Lyall and produced by the US branch of Black Dog Films and RSA Films.

The video is a combination of elements taken from the visuals for "Swoon" and "Dissolve" in the album's accompanying film.

Gavin Free stated on episode 215 of the Rooster Teeth podcast that he worked on the music video.

Chart performance
"Swoon" debuted on the UK Dance Chart on 16 May 2010 at number 13, before falling to number 27 the following week. On 30 May 2010, the single fell to number 30, before climbing to number 22 on its fourth week in the chart. Upon release of the album, "Swoon" climbed to its current peak of number 12 as well as re-entering at number 88 on the UK Singles Chart.

References

2010 singles
The Chemical Brothers songs
Parlophone singles
2010 songs
Songs written by Tom Rowlands
Songs written by Ed Simons